Hoch-Ybrig is a skiing and hiking area in Canton of Schwyz in Switzerland (Municipalities of Unteriberg, Oberiberg).

Hoch-Ybrig is dominated by the mountain range Forstberg - Druesberg (2282 metres) - Twäriberg. These mountains form a boundary between Hoch-Ybrig on one side and Muotathal valley and Canton of Glarus on the other side.

Cablecars 

A cablecar leads from Weglosen (1035 m) to Seebli (1460 m) at the feet of Roggenstock. From Seebli, there are chairlift connections to Spirstock (1771 m) and Sternen (1856 m).

Operating Durations 

The following table displays the operating hours since the 1968/1969 season.

Global warming is having its effect on the area: even though operating in recent duration stays relatively stable, in the last decade the amount of actual snow has declined heavily. For instance in the 2015/2016 season only after 15 January the full area was operational when there was enough snow on all the pistes. in 2016 during 12 and 13 November about 90 centimeters of snow fell, but due to mild temperatures all of it disappeared again in about a week and thus operation could not commence.

The site has 16 snow canons and 3 lances with which they can keep a few slopes open if there is little snow.

References

External links 
 
 Hoch-Ybrig

Geography of the canton of Schwyz
Ski areas in Switzerland
Tourist attractions in the canton of Schwyz